Francis de Bermingham, 14th Baron Athenry (1692 – 1749), was an Anglo-Irish peer.

He was the only son of Edward Bermingham, 13th Baron Athenry, and his second wife Bridget Browne, daughter of Colonel John Browne and  Maud Bourke.

Francis de Bermingham was born the year after the Battle of Aughrim, and in the year the Treaty of Limerick was signed, bringing an end to the Williamite War in Ireland. His family lost much property as a result of the fighting, and  Francis in 1709 conformed to the Church of Ireland to safeguard his remaining lands, as his father had before him.

He is buried in the Dominican Friary, Athenry, founded by his ancestor in 1241. His only surviving son and heir Thomas (son of his first wife, Lady Mary Nugent, daughter of Thomas Nugent, 4th Earl of Westmeath and Margaret Bellew), was created Earl of Louth, while his widow, Ellis, daughter of James Agar, dowager Viscountess of Mayo, was given the title Countess of Brandon for life. He and Mary also had two daughters, Bridget and Mary (died before 1798). Bridget married James Daly of Carrownakelly, County Galway. Mary married Edmund Costello firstly and secondly John Metge MP. John was the younger brother of the prominent High Court judge Peter Metge. He outlived Mary and died sometime after 1823.

References
 History of Galway, James Hardiman, Galway, 1820
 The Abbey of Athenry, Martin J. Blake, Journal of the Galway Archaeological and Historical Society, volume II, part ii, 1902
 The Birmingham family of Athenry, H. T. Knox, J.G.A.H.S., volume ten, numbers iii and iv, 1916–17.
 The Birmingham chalice, J. Rabbitte, J.G.A.H.S., volume 17, i and ii, 1936–37

External links
 Medieval Ireland: an encyclopedia
 Edenderry Historical Society
 The Fitzgeralds: Barons of Offaly

People from County Galway
1692 births
1749 deaths
18th-century Anglo-Irish people
Barons Athenry
Francis